Cherry Grove is a hamlet in central Alberta, Canada within the Municipal District of Bonnyville No. 87.

Demographics 
The population of Cherry Grove according to the 2014 municipal census conducted by the Municipal District of Bonnyville No. 87 is 405.

See also 
List of communities in Alberta
List of hamlets in Alberta

References 

Municipal District of Bonnyville No. 87
Hamlets in Alberta